is a town located in Chikujō District, Fukuoka Prefecture, Japan. , the town had an estimated population of 18,515. The total area is 119.34 km².

Sumo wrestler Shōhōzan Yūya is from here.

References

External links

Chikujō official website 

Towns in Fukuoka Prefecture